Here are the nominees and winners of the Black Reel Award for Best Actress in a Television Movie/Cable. The category was reinstated in 2012 after a four-year hiatus.

Angela Bassett has the most wins in this category with two.

Multiple Nominees

 Lynn Whitfield, Angela Bassett – 3 nominations 
 Jenifer Lewis, Keke Palmer, Halle Berry, Alfre Woodard, Whoopi Goldberg, Anika Noni Rose, Aunjanue Ellis, Queen Latifah – 2 nominations

Winners/Nominees
Notes:
 "†" indicates an Emmy Award–winning performance.
 "‡" indicates an Emmy Award–nominated performance that same year.

References

Black Reel Awards
Television awards for Best Actress